The following outline is provided as an overview of and topical guide to human–computer interaction:

Human–Computer Interaction (HCI) – the intersection of computer science and behavioral sciences — this field involves the study, planning, and design of the interaction between people (users) and computers. Attention to human-machine interaction is important, because poorly designed human-machine interfaces can lead to many unexpected problems. A classic example of this is the Three Mile Island accident where investigations concluded that the design of the human-machine interface was at least partially responsible for the disaster.

What type of thing is human–computer interaction? 

Human–Computer Interaction can be described as all of the following:
 A field of science – systematic enterprise that builds and organizes knowledge in the form of testable explanations and predictions about the universe.
 An applied science – field that applies human knowledge to build or design useful things.
 A field of computer science – scientific and practical approach to computation and its applications.
 An application of engineering – science, skill, and profession of acquiring and applying scientific, economic, social, and practical knowledge, to design and also build structures, machines, devices, systems, materials and processes.
 An application of software engineering – application of a systematic, disciplined, quantifiable approach to the design, development, operation, and maintenance of software, and the study of these approaches; that is, the application of engineering to software.
 A subfield of computer programming – process of designing, writing, testing, debugging, and maintaining the source code of computer programs. This source code is written in one or more programming languages (such as Java, C++, C#, Python, PHP etc.). The purpose of programming is to create a set of instructions that computers use to perform specific operations or to exhibit desired behaviors.
 A social science – academic discipline concerned with society and human behavior.
 A behavioral science – discipline that explores the activities of and interactions among organisms. It involves the systematic analysis and investigation of human and animal behavior through controlled and naturalistic observation, and disciplined scientific experimentation. Examples of behavioral sciences include psychology, psychobiology, and cognitive science.
 A type of system – set of interacting or interdependent components forming an integrated whole or a set of elements (often called 'components' ) and relationships which are different from relationships of the set or its elements to other elements or sets.
 A system that includes software –  software is a collection of computer programs and related data that provides the instructions for telling a computer what to do and how to do it. Software refers to one or more computer programs and data held in the storage of the computer. In other words, software is a set of programs, procedures, algorithms and its documentation concerned with the operation of a data processing system.
 A type of technology – making, modification, usage, and knowledge of tools, machines, techniques, crafts, systems, methods of organization, to solve a problem, improve a preexisting solution to a problem, achieve a goal, handle an applied input/output relation or perform a specific function. It can also refer to the collection of such tools, machinery, modifications, arrangements and procedures. Technologies significantly affect human as well as other animal species' ability to control and adapt to their natural environments.
 A form of computer technology – computers and their application.

Styles of human–computer interaction 
 Command line interface
 Graphical user interface (GUI)
 Copy and paste, Cut and paste
 Single Document Interface, Multiple Document Interface, Tabbed Document Interface
 Elements of graphical user interfaces
 Pointer
 Widget (computing)
 icons
 WIMP (computing)
 Point and click
 Drag and drop
 Window managers
 WYSIWYG (what you see is what you get)
 Zooming user interface (ZUI)
 Brushing and linking
 Crossing-based interface
 Conversational user interface
 Voice computing

Related fields
Human–computer interaction draws from the following fields:
 psychology
 human memory
 human perception
 sensory system
 sociology and social psychology
 cognitive science
 human factors / cognitive ergonomics / physical ergonomics
 repetitive strain injury
 computer science
 computer graphics
 artificial intelligence
 computer vision
 visualization
information visualization
scientific visualization
 knowledge visualization
 design
 industrial design
 graphic design and aesthetics
 information design
 interaction design
 process-centered design
 sonic interaction design
 Interactive Art and HCI
 library and information science, information science
 information security
 HCISec
 speech-language pathology
 personal information management
 phenomenology

History of human–computer interaction 

History of human–computer interaction
 Ivan Sutherland's Sketchpad
 History of automated adaptive instruction in computer applications
 History of the GUI

Interaction paradigms 

 Time-sharing (1959)
 hypertext (Ted Nelson 1963), hypermedia and hyperlinks
 Direct manipulation (ex. lightpen 1963, mice 1968) 
 Desktop metaphor (197x XEROX PARC)
 Windows-Paradigm
 Personal computer
 CSCW: Computer Supported Collaborative (or Cooperative) Work, collaborative software
 Ubiquitous computing ("ubicomp") coined 1988
 World Wide Web (Tim Berners Lee 1989)
 Mobile interaction
 "sensor-based / context-aware interaction"-paradigm

Notable systems and prototypes 
 Office of the future (1940s)
 Sketchpad (1963)
 NLS and The Mother of All Demos (1968)
 Dynabook (circa 1970)
 Xerox Alto (1973)
 Xerox Star (1981)
 Apple Macintosh (1984)
 Knowledge Navigator (1987)
 Project Looking Glass (circa 2003 or 2004)
 The Humane Environment (alpha release, 2004)

General human–computer interaction concepts 
 accessibility and computer accessibility
 adaptive autonomy
 affordance
 banner blindness
 computer user satisfaction
 contextual design and contextual inquiry
 Feminist HCI
 gender HCI
 gulf of evaluation
 gulf of execution
 habituation
 human action cycle
 human interface device
 human–machine interface
 interaction technique
 look and feel
 mode (user interface)
 physiological interaction
 principle of least astonishment
 progressive disclosure
 sonic interaction design
 thanatosensitivity
 transparency
 usability and usability testing
 user, luser
 user experience and user experience design
 user-friendliness
 user interface and user interface design
 user interface engineering and usability engineering
 handheld devices
 Human–computer information retrieval
 Information retrieval
 Internet and the World Wide Web
 multimedia
 Software agents
 Universal usability
 User experience design
 Visual programming languages.
 Knowbility

Hardware 
Hardware input/output devices and peripherals:
 List of input devices
 unit record equipment
 barcode scanner
 keyboard
 computer keyboard
 keyboard shortcut
 ways to make typing more efficient: command history, autocomplete, autoreplace and Intellisense
 microphone
 pointing device
 computer mouse
 mouse chording
 List of output devices
 visual devices
 graphical output device
 display device
 computer display
 video projector
 computer printer
 plotter
 auditory devices
 speakers
 earphones
 tactile devices
 refreshable Braille display
 braille embosser
 Haptic devices

Interface design methods 
 activity-centered design
 Affordance analysis
 bodystorming
 Contextual design
 focus group
 iterative design
 participatory design
 pictive user interface workshop method
 rapid prototyping
 Scenario-based design (SBD)
 task analysis/task modeling
 user-centered design
 usage-centered design
 User scenario
 Value sensitive design
 Wizard of Oz experiment

Usability 
 Usability testing
 heuristic evaluation
 cognitive walkthrough
 usability lab

Models and laws 
 Hick's law
 Fitts' law
 Steering law
 GOMS – goals, operators, methods, and selection rules
 Keystroke-level model (KLM)

Cultural influences

Movies 
Motion pictures featuring interesting user interfaces:
 2001: A Space Odyssey (1968)
 Star Wars Episode IV: A New Hope (1977)
 Alien (1979)
 Blade Runner (1982)
 Tron (1982)
 The Last Starfighter (1984)
 Ghost in the Shell (1991/1995)
 The Lawnmower Man (1992)
 Johnny Mnemonic (1995)
 The Matrix (1999)
 Serial Experiments Lain (1998)
 Final Fantasy: The Spirits Within (2001)
 Minority Report (2002)
 Simone (2002)
 I, Robot (2004)
 Iron Man (2008)
 Avatar (2009)
 Her (2013)

Human–computer interaction organizations

Industrial labs and companies 
Industrial labs and companies known for innovation and research in HCI:
 Alias Wavefront
 Apple Computer
 AT&T Labs
 Bell Labs
 HP Labs
 Microsoft Research
 SRI International (formerly Stanford Research Institute)
 Xerox PARC

Persons influential in human–computer interaction 
 Tim Berners-Lee
 Bill Buxton
 John M. Carroll (information scientist)
 Douglas Engelbart
 Paul Fitts
 Alan Kay
 Steve Mann
 Ted Nelson
 Jakob Nielsen (usability consultant)
 Donald Norman
 Bernhard Preim
 Jef Raskin
 George G. Robertson
 Ben Shneiderman
 Herbert A. Simon
 Ivan Sutherland
 Terry Winograd

See also

References

External links 

 Bad Human Factors Designs
 The HCI Wiki Bibliography  with over 100,000 publications.
 The HCI Bibliography Over 100,000 publications about HCI.
 Human-Centered Computing Education Digital Library
 HCI Webliography

Outlines of computing and engineering
Wikipedia outlines
Usability
Computing-related lists